The Lyon Scots football team represents Lyon College in college football at the NCAA Division III level. The Scots are independents after transitioning from the National Association of Intercollegiate Athletics (NAIA). The Scots play their home games at Pioneer Stadium in Batesville, Arkansas. 

Their head coach is Chris Douglas, who took over the position for the 2020 season.

History 
On June 27, 2013, Lyon College president, Dr. Donald Weatherman, announced the return of American football as a varsity sport after a 62-year hiatus when they last fielded a team as Arkansas College.

Conference affiliations
 Central States Football League (2015–2017)
 Sooner Athletic Conference (2018–2022)
 Independent (2023–present)
 Southern Collegiate Athletic Conference (transitioning in 2024)

List of head coaches

Key

Coaches

Year-by-year results

Notes

References

External links
 

 
American football teams established in 2015
2015 establishments in Arkansas